Jacob ben Nissim ibn Shahin  was a Jewish philosopher and mathematician who lived at Kairouan, Tunisia in the 10th century; he was a younger contemporary of Saadia. At Jacob's request Sherira Gaon wrote a treatise entitled Iggeret, on the redaction of the Mishnah. Jacob is credited with the authorship of an Arabic commentary on the Sefer Yeẓirah (translated into Hebrew by Moses ben Joseph).

He asserts in the introduction that Saadia, while living in Egypt, used to address very insignificant questions to Isaac ben Solomon of Kairouan, and that, on receiving Saadia's commentary, he found that the text had not been understood by the commentator. Jacob therefore decided to write another commentary. In the same introduction Jacob speaks of Galen, repeating the story that that celebrated physician was a Jew named "Gamaliel." The Hebrew translation of Jacob's commentary is still extant in manuscript; excerpts from it have been given by M. H. Landauer and Dukes.

Jacob ben Nissim wrote a work on Indian mathematics under the title Ḥisab al-Ghubar. 

His son and student, Nissim (referred to in later Rabbinic literature as Rabbeinu Nissim, or in Hebrew רבנו ניסים), would later become the head of Yeshiva at Kairouan.

References

 It has the following bibliography:
M. H. Landauer, in Orient, vii. 121;
Julius Fürst, ib. vi. 562;
Dukes, Ḳonṭres ha-Masoret;
Salomon Munk, Notice sur Aboulwalid, p. 47;
Moritz Steinschneider, Cat. Bodl. col. 1243;
idem, Hebr. Uebers. p. 396;
idem, Die Arabische Literatur der Juden, § 58.K

10th-century philosophers
10th-century people of Ifriqiya
10th-century rabbis
Jews of Ifriqiya
People from Kairouan